The 2001 Speedway Conference League was the third tier/division of British speedway.

Summary
The title was won by Sheffield Prowlers, the junior club belonging to the Sheffield Tigers.

Final league table

Conference League Knockout Cup
The 2001 Conference League Knockout Cup was the fourth edition of the Knockout Cup for tier three teams. Somerset Rebels were the winners.

First round

Semi-finals

Final

Other Honours
Conference Trophy final - Somerset Rebels 104 Boston Barracudas 75
Conference League Riders' Championship - David Mason (Rye House)

See also
List of United Kingdom Speedway League Champions

References

Conference
Speedway Conference League